Morocco competed at the 2013 World Games held in Cali, Colombia. Three competitors represented Morocco at the event, all in karate.

Medalists

Karate 

El-Mehdi Benrouida won the bronze medal in the men's kumite 60 kg event.

References 

Nations at the 2013 World Games
2013 in Moroccan sport
2013